The Raleigh IceCaps were a professional ice hockey team based in Raleigh, North Carolina. Founded in 1991 and playing at Dorton Arena, located at the North Carolina State Fairgrounds, the IceCaps were members of the ECHL.  The club was forced to move to Augusta, Georgia as the Augusta Lynx after the 1997–98 season due to the arrival of the NHL's Carolina Hurricanes, who had begun play in Greensboro in 1997–98 in anticipation of the 1999–2000 completion of the Entertainment and Sports Arena and a shift to Raleigh.

References

Defunct ECHL teams
Defunct ice hockey teams in the United States
Ice hockey teams in North Carolina
Ice hockey clubs established in 1991
Sports clubs disestablished in 1998
Toronto Maple Leafs minor league affiliates
Hartford Whalers minor league affiliates
New Jersey Devils minor league affiliates
Anaheim Ducks minor league affiliates
Ottawa Senators minor league affiliates
1991 establishments in North Carolina
1998 disestablishments in North Carolina
Sports in Raleigh, North Carolina